John Jonides (born December 8, 1947) is an American cognitive neuroscientist and psychologist. He is the Edward E. Smith Professor of Psychology and Neuroscience at the University of Michigan. He has been a fellow of the American Association for the Advancement of Science since 1995 and of the Society of Experimental Psychologists since 1996. He is known for his research on the malleability of human intelligence, and on the effects of Facebook use on happiness and life satisfaction. In 2011, he received the Association for Psychological Science's William James Fellow Award.

References

External links
Faculty page

American cognitive neuroscientists
Fellows of the American Association for the Advancement of Science
University of Michigan faculty
University of Pennsylvania alumni
Living people
1947 births